Goodenia suffrutescens is a species of flowering plant in the family Goodeniaceae and is endemic to inland areas of north-eastern Western Australia. It is an undershrub with low-lying branches, toothed, lance-shaped to egg-shaped leaves with the narrower end towards the base, and thyrses of blue flowers.

Description

Taxonomy and naming
Goodenia suffrutescens was first formally described in 1980 by Roger Charles Carolin in the journal Telopea from material he collected by on Billiluna Station in 1970. The specific epithet (suffrutescens) refers to the sub-shrub form of the plant.

Distribution and habitat
This goodenia grows on laterite pavements on the north-western edge of the Tanami Desert in north-eastern Western Australia.

Conservation status
Goodenia suffrutescens is classified as "Priority One" by the Government of Western Australia Department of Parks and Wildlife, meaning that it is known from only one or a few locations which are potentially at risk.

References

suffrutescens
Eudicots of Western Australia
Plants described in 1980
Taxa named by Roger Charles Carolin
Endemic flora of Australia